Ummey Razia Kajol is a Bangladesh Awami League politician and the former Member of Bangladesh Parliament from a reserved seat.

Early life
Kajol was born on 1 February 1966 and she has a law degree.

Career
Kajol was elected to parliament from reserved seat as a Bangladesh Awami League candidate in 2014.

References

Awami League politicians
Living people
1966 births
Women members of the Jatiya Sangsad
10th Jatiya Sangsad members
21st-century Bangladeshi women politicians
21st-century Bangladeshi politicians